Poljane pri Štjaku is a small settlement southeast of Štjak in the Municipality of Sežana in the Littoral region of Slovenia.

Name
The name of the settlement was changed from Poljane to Poljane pri Štjaku in 1953.

References

External links
Poljane pri Štjaku on Geopedia

Populated places in the Municipality of Sežana